Juan de Prado Malleza  Portocarrero y Luna (1716 – c. 1770) was  a Spanish colonial governor of Cuba between 1761 and 1762, when he lost Havana in the Siege of Havana.

Biography
Born at León, Spain, he was the second son of the 2nd Marquess of Prado and Acapulco and 5th Count of Óbedos, and had a career in the Army, where he became mariscal de campo.

In mid-1760, Juan de Prado was named Governor and Captain General of the Island of Cuba by  King Charles III of Spain but did not take possession of his office until February, 1761. He was ordered to strengthen the island's fortresses against an expected offensive by the British, as Spain had entered the Seven Years' War that year on the side of France.
   
On February 7, 1761, the first works to fortify the heights of La Cabaña, overlooking the bay, and the main fortress el Morro, were begun. That same year, the city was hit by an epidemic of yellow fever that caused numerous victims among the urban population. The work force was so decimated that work on the fortifications was practically paralyzed.

On June 6, 1762, a powerful British expeditionary force under George Keppel began the siege of Havana. Juan de Prado took command of the defense, but the city was eventually captured on the 13th of August.

Juan de Prado and the surviving Spanish soldiers were transported back to Spain. Upon his arrival, the Spanish government tried him via a court-martial. He was convicted of incompetence and a lack of energy in the defence of Havana, and was sentenced to death, but the sentence was commuted to ten years' imprisonment. He died in prison at Vitigudino.

1716 births
1770s deaths
Governors of Cuba
Spanish generals
People who were court-martialed
Spanish people who died in prison custody
Spanish prisoners sentenced to death
Prisoners sentenced to death by Spain
Prisoners who died in Spanish detention
People from León, Spain
Spanish colonial period of Cuba
Spanish West Indies
18th-century Cuban people